Hiker Chiu (born 1966) is a Taiwanese intersex human rights activist who founded Oii-Chinese in 2008 and cofounded Intersex Asia in 2018.

Early life 
Chiu did not fully develop the secondary sexual characteristics expected of women during his/her adolescent years. Upon viewing his/her medical records, s/he discovered that a physician had described his/her condition, in English, as a "pseudo hermaphrodite." Chiu felt that this description made him/her a "monster." Chiu asked his/her parents about his/her condition. They stated that s/he was both male and female with "two sets." Chiu did not learn about the word intersex until viewing the film XXY in 2008, and after s/he reread his/her medical files regarding surgical and hormonal treatment performed in his/her early years.

Activism 
Through Oii-Chinese organisation aims to end "normalising" surgeries on intersex children, promote awareness of intersex issues, and improve government recognition of gender. The organisation also gives lectures and lobbies government. As part of this mission, Chiu started a "free hugs with intersex" campaign at Taiwan Pride in 2010.  This was also the first time Chiu appeared in public as an intersex person.

Chiu participated in the first International Intersex Forum in 2011, including as a spokesperson. In 2015, Chiu joined an international advisory board for a first philanthropic Intersex Human Rights Fund established by the Astraea Lesbian Foundation for Justice. In the same year, Chiu was elected to the board of the International Lesbian, Gay, Bisexual, Trans and Intersex Association, representing ILGA Asia.

Chiu is a co-founder of Intersex Asia, established in 2018.

References 

Living people
Intersex rights activists
Intersex rights in China
1966 births
Intersex rights in Taiwan
Taiwanese LGBT people
Intersex people